Nicholas "Nicky" McDonald (born 23 November 1996) is a Scottish singer. He was the runner-up of the tenth series of The X Factor in 2013. After the show, he signed with RCA Records and released his debut album In the Arms of an Angel in March 2014, peaking at number 6 on the UK Albums Chart.

Early life
McDonald was born in Wishaw, South Lanarkshire to parents Eileen and Derrick McDonald. He has an older brother called Kevin, a younger brother called Lewis, and a younger sister called Julia. He suffers from the rare heart condition Long QT syndrome and, in an interview with the Daily Star, told how he almost died when he was eight.

McDonald previously attended St Aidan's High School in Wishaw. He missed Sixth Year due to The X Factor and quit in January 2014 after the show.

Career

The X Factor (2013–2014)

On 4 June 2013, McDonald auditioned in Glasgow for the tenth series of The X Factor in front of judges Louis Walsh, Gary Barlow, Nicole Scherzinger and Sharon Osbourne. He sang Secret Garden's "You Raise Me Up" and received three yeses from the judges except for Barlow, who reasoned that he was not yet ready for the competition. At the arena auditions, he sang "A Thousand Years" and received four yeses from the judges, putting him through to bootcamp in the boys category, mentored by Walsh. At the six-chair challenge, he was the final contestant in the boys category to perform. He sang Jason Mraz's "I Won't Give Up" and afterwards Walsh said, "That was my favourite audition of the entire night." McDonald took the seat of Alejandro Fernandez-Holt and progressed through to judges' houses. At judges' houses he sang "If You're Not the One" and "Someone like You". Walsh later chose him for the live shows, along with Luke Friend and Sam Callahan.

McDonald advanced through every week without ever being in the bottom two. On 8 December, along with Sam Bailey and Luke Friend, he made it to the final. He became the first Scottish contestant to achieve this feat since Leon Jackson in 2007. On the 7th of December he published a song titled "Born on SouthSide", On 14 December, he duetted with former Westlife singer Shane Filan and was later announced as one of the final two, advancing along with Bailey. After singing "Superman (It's Not Easy)" by Five for Fighting as his winner's song, he finished as runner-up to Bailey. When the weekly voting statistics were revealed after the final, they showed that McDonald and Bailey had been the top two contestants every week; McDonald won three weeks and Bailey won the other seven.

In the Arms of an Angel (2014–2017)

After the show ended, McDonald quit school to concentrate on his singing career. In January 2014, McDonald announced that he had signed with RCA Records and would release his debut album in March. McDonald said, "When I found out that I was signing to RCA I was over the moon as I knew that they worked with some of the biggest artists in the world. It feels absolutely amazing to be recording my own album and I can't wait to get it out there and give something back to all the fans who have supported me from the very start."

On 22 January, he confirmed the title of his debut album, Arms of an Angel, though it was later changed to In the Arms of an Angel. The album includes covers of songs such as Bruno Mars's "Just the Way You Are", Adele's "Someone Like You" and Westlife's "Flying Without Wings", all of which McDonald performed on The X Factor. It also contains three original tracks which he had been working on since the show-"Answerphone", "Smile" and "Solid Gold". The album was preceded by the lead single "Answerphone", which was released on 16 March, the day before the album, the song peaked at number 73 on the UK Singles Chart and number 28 on the Scottish Singles Chart. He released his debut album In the Arms of an Angel on 17 March 2014. On 23 March 2014 the album entered the UK Albums Chart at number 6 and number 1 on the Scottish Albums Chart.

McDonald recently made a guest appearance at the ChrichMelex 2016 Awards Ceremony, joined by other X Factor finalists from past seasons.

Upcoming second album (2017–present)
In 2017, work towards a second studio album was announced via McDonald's official website and McDonald was cited acts such as Michael Jackson, Bruno Mars, One Direction and Justin Bieber as influences towards the musical sound that will be contained on his upcoming album. As of August 2017, no release date has been confirmed by McDonald or by his record label.

Personal life
McDonald was diagnosed with Long QT Syndrome at a young age, which is a rare heart condition that causes delayed repolarization of the heart following a heartbeat which in turn increases the risk of episodes of torsades de pointes. He is also a supporter of Scottish football club Rangers F.C.

On 31 August 2019, he got engaged to his American girlfriend, Brandi Sommer, and they married a week later.

Discography

Albums

Singles

Tours
 The X Factor Live Tour (2014)
 MAC Music Tour (2014)

References

External links
 

1996 births
Living people
Scottish child singers
21st-century Scottish male singers
RCA Records artists
The X Factor (British TV series) contestants